Alexander Löbe (born 13 November 1972) is a German former professional footballer who played as a forward. He now works as Team Head at Puma SE in his home country.

Career
Löbe started his senior career with Hallescher FC in 1990. In 1999, he signed for Erzurumspor in the Turkish Süper Lig, where he made thirty-one appearances and scored fifteen goals. After that, he played for Turkish clubs Trabzonspor and Malatyaspor, and German clubs SG Wattenscheid 09, SC Paderborn 07, Rot-Weiss Essen, and TuS Radevormwald before retiring in 2008.

References

External links 
 
 
 Alexander Löbe: Wandervogel fand sein Glück im Orient 
 Löbe Trabzon'u özledi 
 ekşi sözlük Entry 
 Reviersport Tag 
 "Afrika ist schlimm, aber doch kein Abstieg!" 
 Wandervogel zwischen den Welten
 Löbe genießt Priorität 
 Donkov und Löbe nicht beschuldigt 
 Löbes Tor zum Einstand 
 Löbe schießt Paderborn aus der Krise
 Löbe krönt Dotschews Comeback 
 Bundesliga.at Profile

1972 births
Living people
Association football forwards
German footballers
German expatriate footballers
Expatriate footballers in Turkey
Trabzonspor footballers
Malatyaspor footballers
SG Wattenscheid 09 players
Hallescher FC players
SpVgg Unterhaching players
MSV Duisburg players
FC Gütersloh 2000 players
VfB Lübeck players
Expatriate footballers in Austria
SK Vorwärts Steyr players
Rot-Weiss Essen players
Sportspeople from Jena